Frank Thomas Shaver (10 February 1881 – 11 December 1969) was a Conservative member of the House of Commons of Canada. He was born in Osnabruck Centre, Ontario and became a merchant. Shaver attended the Morrisburg Collegiate Institute. He was one of the principals of the Jarvis and Shaver General Store.

He was first elected to Parliament at the Stormont riding in the 1930 general election. After serving one term in the House of Commons, Shaver was defeated by Lionel Chevrier of the Liberal party in the 1935 federal election. Shaver made an unsuccessful bid as a Progressive Conservative to unseat Chevrier in the 1949 election. 

He died at Cornwall General Hospital in 1969.

References

External links
 

1881 births
Canadian merchants
Conservative Party of Canada (1867–1942) MPs
Members of the House of Commons of Canada from Ontario
1969 deaths